The 1999 NCAA Skiing Championships were contested at the Sunday River ski area, near the town of Newry, Maine, at the 46th annual NCAA-sanctioned ski tournament to determine the individual and team national champions of men's and women's collegiate slalom and cross-country skiing in the United States.

Defending champions Colorado, coached by Richard Rokos, won the team championship, the Buffaloes' fifteenth title overall and fourth as a co-ed team.

Venue

This year's championships were contested at the Sunday River ski area, in Newry, Maine.

Bates College, in Lewiston, Maine, served as hosts.

These were the second championships held at Sunday River and the third in the state of Maine (1967, 1976, and 1999).

Program

Men's events
 Cross country, 10 kilometer freestyle
 Cross country, 20 kilometer classical
 Slalom
 Giant slalom

Women's events
 Cross country, 5 kilometer freestyle
 Cross country, 15 kilometer classical
 Slalom
 Giant slalom

Team scoring

 DC – Defending champions
 Debut team appearance

See also
 List of NCAA skiing programs

References

1999 in sports in Maine
NCAA Skiing Championships
NCAA Skiing Championships
1999 in alpine skiing
1999 in cross-country skiing
Newry, Maine
College sports tournaments in Maine